The Russian Empire national football team was the association football team representing the Russian Empire from 1910 to 1914.

History
The Russian Empire played its first unofficial international in October 1910 against Bohemia national team, a 5–4 win. The All-Russian Football Union was founded in January 1912 and it was admitted to FIFA in the same year. The first official international for the team was the second round match against Finland national team at the 1912 Summer Olympics in Stockholm, with the Finns competing separately despite being a part of Russia at the time.

The development of league football in Russia was stopped by the outbreak of First World War in 1914. Meetings with the Germany national team and France national team were planned for the spring of 1915, but the matches were cancelled. A large number of players were killed in the war and others fled the country after the 1917 October Revolution. The Soviet Union national football team was formed in August 1923 and it was accepted by FIFA as the successor of the Russian Empire football team, itself becoming the Russia national football team in 1992.

Managers
 Georges Duperron (1910–1913)
 Robert Fulda (1914)

Competitive record

Olympic Games

International record
The Russian Empire national football team played a total number of 8 official and 8 unofficial internationals between October 1910 and July 1914.

(1) Russian Empire's score is shown first.

Head-to-head record
Up to matches played on 12 July 1914.

Player records

Player records include official internationals only.

Most capped players

Top goalscorers

References 

Russian Empire
Former national association football teams in Europe
Association football clubs established in 1910
Association football clubs disestablished in 1914
1910 establishments in the Russian Empire
1914 disestablishments in the Russian Empire
Sport in the Russian Empire
National sports teams established in 1910